Friend Ripp (German: Freund Ripp) is a 1923 German silent film directed by Alfred Halm and starring Carl Geppert, Ilka Grüning, and Käthe Haack.

The film's sets were designed by the art director Franz Schroedter.

Cast
In alphabetical order
 Carl Geppert 
 Ilka Grüning 
 Käthe Haack 
 Harry Halm
 Karl Harbacher 
 Leonhard Haskel 
 Edgar Klitzsch 
 Hermann Picha 
 Charles Puffy 
 Fritz Richard 
 Fritz Spira 
 Hugo Werner-Kahle 
 Max Zilzer

References

External links

1923 films
Films of the Weimar Republic
Films directed by Alfred Halm
German silent feature films
German black-and-white films